Osama "Ozzie" Malik (born 30 September 1990) is an Australian professional footballer who plays as a defensive midfielder or centre-back for Indian Super League club Odisha.

Club career
Malik signed for Adelaide United's youth squad at the commencement of the A-League 2008–09 season. Prior to this he had been plying his trade for local clubs Croydon Kings and Adelaide Raiders where he made his senior debut at the age of 17. In early 2008, Malik spent two weeks on trial at Italian club Torino.

Adelaide United manager Aurelio Vidmar called up Osama to the first team squad as a replacement for injured striker Paul Agostino for the FIFA Club World Cup. There, Malik made his professional debut on 14 December 2008 in the match against Gamba Osaka, replacing Cristiano in the 77th minute.

On 3 June 2009, Malik signed a one-year deal with the North Queensland Fury as an under-21 player after playing most of the last year at Adelaide Galaxy.

For the 2011–12 season, Malik signed with Adelaide United and manager Rini Coolen. However, on 17 May 2011 Adelaide United approached North Queensland Fury asking for an early release, which was granted, allowing Malik to play for Adelaide United for the remainder of the 2010–11 Season.

Malik was signed by Melbourne City in January 2016.

Odisha
In June 2022, it was announced that Indian Super League club Odisha have signed Malik on a year-long deal. On 23 August, he made his debut for the club against Kerala Blasters in the Durand Cup, in a 2–0 win.

Career statistics

Club

Honours
Adelaide United
FFA Cup: 2014

Melbourne City
FFA Cup: 2016

Individual
Adelaide United Rising Star: 2011–12
 Best Team Man Award: 2013–14

References

External links
 Adelaide United profile
 Osama Malik at goal.com

1990 births
Living people
Association football midfielders
A-League Men players
FFSA Super League players
Croydon Kings players
Northern Fury FC players
Adelaide United FC players
Melbourne City FC players
Al Batin FC players
Perth Glory FC players
Australian soccer players
Soccer players from Adelaide
Saudi Professional League players
Australia youth international soccer players
Australia under-20 international soccer players
Expatriate footballers in Saudi Arabia
Australian people of Sudanese descent
Australian expatriate sportspeople in Saudi Arabia